Maharashtra National Law University Mumbai (MNLU Mumbai) is a National Law University located at Mumbai, Maharashtra, India, and is one of the most prestigious law schools in India. 

MNLU Mumbai offers a five-year integrated B.A LL.B.(Hons.) programme and LL.M. Programmes. Students have to qualify for CLAT to secure admission to UG or PG. Admissions are through Common Law Admission Test. There 100 seats filled up by CLAT and 20 supernumerary seats are reserved for Foreign National/ NRI/ NRI Sponsored. Two supernumerary seats are reserved for Permanent Residents of Jammu and Kashmir.

Chief Justice of India is the Chancellor of the university and Bhavani Prasad Panda was the founder Vice Chancellor (VC) of the university.  Prof.(Dr.) Dilip Ukey is the VC.
Students have performed well in various fields like: Literary and Debating Competitions, Cultural Competitions, Moot Court Competitions, Alternate Dispute Resolution Competitions.

 

MNLU Mumbai has entered into MoUs with various institutions of international repute including L’Universite’
Paris Nanterre and Berlin School of Economics and Law (BSEL), Germany, thereby facilitating regular
student exchange programmes with these prestigious Universities.

For the first two years MNLU Mumbai shared its campus with Tata Institute of Social Sciences. In 2017 it shifted its campus to the Centre for Excellence in Telecom Technology and Management at Hiranandani Gardens, Powai, Mumbai. Permanent campus is set up at Gorai near Maharashtra Judicial Academy which will be of approx 60 Acres.

The university also runs various extra credit and
certificate courses such as Mediation, Data Protection Law and foreign languages such as German and Spanish
on regular basis.
MNLU Mumbai is steered by distinguished judges, senior advocates, seasoned bureaucrats and eminent academicians as members of its governing bodies. Adhering to the motto: Dharme Tatparta, the university is
committed to championing the cause of social justice. It practices 'Zero Tolerance' towards any discrimination
based on sex, race, creed, class, caste, place of birth, religious belief or professional or political or other
opinion.

With an aim of achieving excellence in research, the university in short span of time, has already established
following research centres:
 Centre for Clinical Legal Education (CCLE)
 Centre for Maritime Law and Research (CML&R)
 Centre for Research in Criminal Justice (CRCJ)
 Centre for Information and Communication Technology and Law (CICTL)
 Centre for Goods and Services Tax and Training (CGSTT)
 Centre for Research In Air and Space Law (CRASL)
 Centre for Mediation & Research

Due to its present location students have variety of internship opportunities as various civil and criminal courts and Principal Bench of Bombay High Court is within the city.

Various keynote speakers here are distinguished Jurists, Judges of various High Courts, Advocates, IAS officers, businessmen, law firm attorneys and key politicians.

References

External links
 Official website

Law schools in Maharashtra
National Law Universities
Universities in Mumbai
Educational institutions established in 2014
2014 establishments in Maharashtra